Shell Australia is the Australian subsidiary of Shell. Shell has operated in Australia since 1901, initially delivering bulk fuel into Australia, then establishing storage and distribution terminals, oil refineries, and a network of service stations. It extended its Australian activities to oil exploration, petrochemicals and coal mining, and became a leading partner in Australia's largest resource development project, the North West Shelf Venture.

In August 2014, Shell sold its downstream business in Australia, including its Geelong Oil Refinery and 870 retail sites, along with its bulk fuels, bitumen, chemicals and part of its lubricants businesses, to the Dutch firm Vitol, for A$2.9 billion.

Aside from its aviation fuel business which was retained, Shell's remaining Australian activities are in upstream businesses, comprising exploration, liquified natural gas (LNG) and onshore coal seam gas.

Shell holds large reserves in the North West Shelf, Gorgon, Browse Basin, onshore coal seam gas Surat and Bowen Basins in Queensland. It also maintains a substantial exploration portfolio in Australia with major representation in permits and reserves offshore Western Australia and the Northern Territory.

A new head office in King Square, Perth opened in January 2016.

History 
Shell's involvement in Australia began in 1901 when bulk fuel handling facilities commissioned by the 'Shell' Transport and Trading Company of London at Gore Bay, Sydney and on leased land in Melbourne, near Williamstown railway station. The arrival of the ship Turbo on 3 June was the first ever delivery of bulk kerosene to Australia.

In 1903, the tanker  – owned by the Shell/Royal Dutch joint venture Asiatic Petroleum Company – was wrecked outside of Port Phillip Bay, causing Australia's first major oil spill.

In 1905, the Shell Transport and Trading Company and the Royal Dutch Petroleum Company established the British Imperial Oil Company in Australia as a joint venture. In 1916, Shell began bulk delivery to garages equipped with pumps. In 1926 it acquired the Neptune Oil Company; a year later the British Imperial Oil Company was renamed the Shell Company of Australia, and in 1928 it purchased the Clyde Refinery in Sydney.

In 1954, Shell opened its second oil refinery in Geelong, and in 1959 established a detergent alkylate plant at Geelong and a petrochemical plant at Clyde. Its oil development arm was very active in the 1960s exploring large areas of onshore Australia as well as offshore opportunities.

In 1984, domestic sales of LNG from the North West Shelf began, and a year later, Shell and its joint venture partners signed a sales and purchase agreement for North West Shelf LNG with eight Japanese electricity and gas utilities. By this stage Shell had increased its holding in joint venture operator Woodside Petroleum from 21% to 40%. The company is one of six participants and holds a 16.67% equity stake, alongside five other investors: BP, BHP Billiton Petroleum, Chevron, Mitsubishi/Mitsui and Woodside.

Sale of downstream business
In August 2014, Shell sold its Australian refinery in Geelong and petrol stations for A$2.9 billion (US$2.6 billion) to Vitol, a Geneva based company. Vitol operates these assets as Viva Energy, which maintains Shell branding on its service stations under a brand licence arrangement.

Projects

Prelude
In May 2011, Royal Dutch Shell finalised its investment for the world's first floating liquefied natural gas (FLNG) facility. Shell had explored the concept of a FLNG in Namibia in the 1990s, but was abandoned due to unfavourable economic conditions.

The floating vessel to be used for the Prelude field, known as Prelude FLNG, was still being constructed in Geoje, South Korea in mid-June 2014. The hull of the vessel was completed in December 2013 and the Prelude was scheduled to start producing LNG in 2016—analysts estimated the total cost of construction at more than US$12 billion.

In December 2018, production started at the facility. The company has a 67.5 percent hold, alongside investors CPC Corporation, Inpex Corporation, and Korea Gas Corporation.

Ningaloo
In July 2011, the Federal Government gave approval for the company to drill an exploration well  to the west of the Ningaloo Marine Park.

Surat 
In February 2019, Royal Dutch Shell was granted leases for $10 billion (AUS) towards the Surat project, which it will undergo with PetroChina under the joint venture of Arrow Energy. In December 2017, a 27-year deal was agreed in which Arrow would sell output to the company's Queensland Curtis LNG (QCNLG) project. It will use infrastructure from the company's QCLNG project do develop the biggest coal seam gas resource in the country, which is predicted to speed up the process and reduce the environmental impact.

Sponsorships
Shell was tile sponsor of Dick Johnson Racing from 1987 until 2004. Having remained as a minor sponsor, it again became title sponsor for the rebranded DJR Team Penske in 2017. It also returned as the official fuel supplier for the series, having been so between 1987 and 2001.

See also

List of automotive fuel retailers
List of convenience stores
Gorgon gas project

Notes

References

External links

 

Oil companies of Australia
Shell plc subsidiaries
Automotive fuel retailers in Australia
Australian subsidiaries of foreign companies